The Lyre River in the U.S. state of Washington flows out of Lake Crescent in the Olympic National Park and into the Strait of Juan de Fuca. Originally referred to as "singing waters" by the indians living near it, the river was first named Rio de Cuesta by Europeans in 1790 by Gonzalo López de Haro, but was later called River Lyre after being charted by Captain Henry Kellett in 1847.

Course
The Lyre River flows roughly northwest out of Lake Crescent, first encountering June Creek, then turning north at the point that is joined by Boundary Creek on the left. At River Mile 2.7 the river tumbles down the Lyre River Falls, which are impassable to fish migrating upstream. Continuing north, the river is joined by Susie Creek on the left, and finally Nelson Creek on the right before emptying into the Strait of Juan de Fuca at Low Point.

Ecology
The first few hundred feet of the river as it flows out of the lake provide spawning habitat for the Beardslee trout (Oncorhynchus mykiss irideus f. beardsleei), which is found nowhere else. Below the falls that are  upriver from the mouth, the river supports stocks of coastal cutthroat trout, as well as winter and summer steelhead.

History
The Makah tribe considered the Lyre to be their eastern boundary, though members of the Elwha Klallam tribe had settlements along the river as well, including the fishing village of Kwahamish.

By the early 1890s, John Smith had taken up a claim at Piedmont; John Hanson and his wife Mary Laeger Hanson had homesteaded near the head of the Lyre River. From 1889 through the 1920s, there was a settlement named Gettysburg on the east side of the mouth of the river. Gettysburg was founded as a logging town by Robert Getty and had a population of 65 in 1910. It also had a post office.

The Lyre River Campground is administered by the Washington Department of Natural Resources near the mouth of the river.

See also
List of rivers of Washington

References

Rivers of Washington (state)
Rivers of Clallam County, Washington
Landforms of Olympic National Park